James Joseph Carbery (1 May 1823 – 17 December 1887), was an Irish Dominican, who became the third Bishop of Hamilton, Canada.

Life
Carbery's early education was received at the Seminary of Navan. At an early age, he entered enrolled in the Order of St. Dominic, studying philosophy and theology at Viterbo and Rome. He returned to Ireland in 1849, filled many important positions in his order, and became an assistant to the master general. While in Limerick, Dr. Carbery oversaw many improvements to St Saviour's Church, Limerick.

In 1883, Carbery was appointed Bishop of Hamilton, Canada, and was consecrated in Rome, 11 November of the same year. He died while seeking to restore his failing health while visiting his native country, in cork, on December 19th, and was buried in the little convent cemetery in Limerick.

See also
 Dominicans in Ireland

Attribution

1823 births
1887 deaths
Canadian Dominicans
Irish Dominicans
Irish expatriate Catholic bishops
19th-century Irish Roman Catholic priests
19th-century Roman Catholic bishops in Canada
19th-century Irish bishops
Roman Catholic bishops of Hamilton, Ontario